James Laidlaw may refer to:
James Laidlaw (anthropologist) (born 1963), British anthropologist 
James Laidlaw (politician) (1822–1905), Canadian politician
James Lees Laidlaw (1868–1932), American banker and philanthropist
Jimmy Laidlaw (born 1873), Scottish footballer

See also